Neumagen-Dhron is a former Verbandsgemeinde ("collective municipality") in the district Bernkastel-Wittlich, in Rhineland-Palatinate, Germany. Its seat of administration was in Neumagen-Dhron. It was disbanded on 1 January 2012.

The Verbandsgemeinde Neumagen-Dhron consisted of the following Ortsgemeinden ("local municipalities"):

 Minheim 
 Neumagen-Dhron
 Piesport 
 Trittenheim

Former Verbandsgemeinden in Rhineland-Palatinate